Black reconnaissance or BRCON is a term describing military deep penetration reconnaissance of a completely covert nature. It is distinct from normal forms of covert recon in that discovery of the action would be so disruptive to relations between two countries that the instigators would be disavowed if caught.

Black reconnaissance and other forms of covert and espionage action

Black reconnaissance is different from more common terms such as covert ops and other military forms of recon in that covert operations are kept secret to protect the lives of the team conducting the mission. Black recon is kept secret because discovery would lead to political ramifications, and the lives of those conducting the reconnaissance are secondary. In the case that a black recon effort is discovered, the government denies any involvement. For air-related black recon the usual explanation given is equipment failure and drifting off course, while ground-based black recon is usually explained away as someone violating orders.

Black reconnaissance is also not a form of espionage, per se. The primary objective of black reconnaissance is to perform a military task, not to engage in any form of non-military intelligence gathering. The fact that such elements are incorporated into the reconnaissance mission is because most times, this will be the only reconnaissance allowed before a military action is taken.

During World War II, black reconnaissance took on a slightly different meaning, where it indicated a form of recon for a surprise attack that if discovered, meant the attack would have to be redesigned or even abandoned. Many elements incorporated into modern black reconnaissance efforts were pioneered by World War II fighters and ground recon crews.

Types of black reconnaissance

The earliest black reconnaissance missions were flown during World War II, by all sides of the war. The fastest fighters were stripped of everything except fuel, painted matte black, and flew at night, trying to identify bombing targets, locate fleets, and the like. The USS Ranger was fitted out with special planes just for this purpose, and used them in preparing for Operation Torch in the Mediterranean.

Most BRCON was traditionally conducted by specially constructed spy planes of the United States against the Soviet Union, using high powered cameras to overfly Soviet airspace to locate the positions of missile silos, and by Soviet planes using MAD or FLIR gear to locate US ballistic missile submarines. This was a back and forth effort on the part of the two superpowers and lead to the development of single-use planes such as the SR-71, the SR-75, and the Soviet Tsybin RSR.

After the end of the Cold War, most black reconnaissance is now of a ground nature, mixing standard reconnaissance objectives such as mapping terrain and identifying targets with HUMINT objectives, political assessments, and designing mission specifications to avoid ambushes. Missions of this nature were run constantly during the Vietnam War, along with other elements of Project Phoenix, operating out of Cambodia and Laos, where they not only acted to scout military objectives but to identify psy-war targets. These missions, predominantly conducted by MACV-SOG, were carried out in many cases by soldiers who carried no manner of identification, and did not carry American weapons as a method to increase plausible deniability in the event of capture or death.

Black reconnaissance in media

Quite a few fiction novels have been written on the topic of black recon and its effects on the world sphere. Authors such as Richard Moran and John Ringo often incorporate both ground-based and air-based black reconnaissance concepts in their books, and movies such as the Bourne series blur the lines between "civilian" intelligence methods and "military" intelligence methods. It appears quite commonly in various conspiracy theories, and is often confused with black intelligence operations from government groups like the CIA.

References

External links
 Example of a Black Recon jet, the SR-75

Espionage
Reconnaissance
Covert operations